Shadow of the Beast is an action-adventure game developed by Heavy Spectrum Entertainment Labs and published by Sony Interactive Entertainment for the PlayStation 4 in 2016. It is a remake and re-imagining of the 1989 game of the same name.

Gameplay
Gameplay of Shadow of the Beast combines platform and action elements, with the introduction of combos. Players have to defeat enemies. This can be achieved by counter-attacking to strike them down; shield-wielding foes  must be ducked behind in order to defeat them. It features a traditional health bar, combos through quick time events, traps, and puzzles. The game features the parallax scrolling from the original title, using some 3D elements.

The original Shadow of the Beast is included in the remake as an unlockable extra. An "infinite lives" mode was added to make the original game easier to play.

Plot
The game follows the story of its original predecessor. Players control Aarbron, a seventh born to a seventh child, who was born so strong that Maletoth, a reaper of spirits, saw in him the potential to hold a great power. Maletoth kidnaps Aarbron. While Aarbron's mother leads the search of her son, perishing in the process, Maletoth brings Aarbron to the Gate of Souls, where he ordered the Council of Mages to corrupt Aarbron through magic. Aarbron becomes a monstrous warrior-servant manipulated by Maletoth for his quest to conquer the world.

Later, Maletoth learns of another strong child, so he commissions the mage Zelek to kidnap this child by using Aarbron. In the meanwhile, Aarbron's father had turned to the Seekers, a group of people dedicated to stopping Maletoth. The Seekers discover Maletoth's plan to kidnap this second child to replace Aarbron. The Seekers find the child before Zelek in the attempt of keeping her safe from Maletoth. However, Zelek learns of this plan and uses Aarbron to slaughter everyone involved in protecting the child, including Aarbron's father.

Killing his father awakens Aarbron. He pursues Zelek, who had found refuge in the lands of the Dryads and given the child to the Queen of the land. The Queen sends the child to Maletoth, while unsuccessfully trying to kill Aarbron. The child is delivered to Maletoth, while Aarbron learns of Maletoth' machinations from a dying Zelek.

Aarbron goes to Hydrath's castle to defeat Hidrath and enter the portal the leads to Maletoth. The Sentinel, another of Maletoth's creation that seek revenge, sees in Aarbron the power to finally take on Maletoth and helps him in this endeavor. The Sentinel brings Aarbron to the Graveyard of the Fallen so that he could channel the soul trapped there and gain power. Empowered by these souls, Aarbron defeats Maletoth, taking his power for his own.

Development
Shadow of the Beast was announced for PlayStation 4 during Gamescom. The first trailer was revealed, together with the announcement of Heavy Spectrum Entertainment Labs being the developer of the game. The first gameplay footage during E3 2015. The game released on 17 May 2016.

The game uses the Unreal Engine 4 as its underlying engine technology, and Audiokinetic Wwise for audio.

Reception

Shadow of the Beast received "mixed or average reviews", according to review aggregator Metacritic. IGN awarded it a score of 7.6 out of 10, stating: "Bloody, elegant combat and an otherworldly vibe make Shadow of the Beast a successful reboot of the Amiga classic." Writing for Metro, David Jenkins described the game as taking the inspiration from the art and concept of the somewhat flawed original and marrying this with influences from modern action games, such as Castlevania: Lords of Shadow and Heavenly Sword, to create something greater than its own legacy. GameSpot awarded it a more negative review of 5 out of 10, stating that "For a remake, it's not a good sign that the best part about the modern Shadow of the Beast is revisiting the game that inspired it."

References

External links
 
 

2016 video games
Action-adventure games
Dark fantasy video games
Platform games
PlayStation 4 games
PlayStation 4-only games
Science fantasy video games
Single-player video games
Sony Interactive Entertainment games
Unreal Engine games
Video game remakes
Video games developed in the United Kingdom
Video games set in castles
Video games with 2.5D graphics